The 2012 Brown Bears football team represented Brown University in the 2012 NCAA Division I FCS football season. They were led by 15th year head coach Phil Estes and played their home games at Brown Stadium. They are a member of the Ivy League. They finished the season 7–3, 4–3 in Ivy League play to finish in a three way tie for third place. Brown averaged 6,871 fans per game.

Schedule

Source: Schedule

References

Brown
Brown Bears football seasons
Brown Bears football